Flesch may refer to:

Surname 
Carl Flesch (1873–1944), Hungarian violinist and pedagogue
Colette Flesch (born 1937), Luxembourgian former politician and fencer
Gerhard Flesch (1909–1948), German Nazi Gestapo and SS officer executed for war crimes
Jeb Flesch (born 1969), American football player
Josef Flesch (1781–1839), Moravian writer
Rudolf Flesch (1911–1986), creator of Flesch Reading Ease test and co-creator of the Flesch-Kincaid Readability Test
Siegfried Flesch (1872–1939), Austrian Olympic medalist saber fencer
Steve Flesch (born 1967), American golfer

Other uses 
Flesch–Kincaid readability tests

See also
Fleisch (disambiguation)
Flesh (disambiguation)

German-language surnames